Patience Drake "Pat" Roggensack (born July 7, 1940) is an American attorney and jurist.  She is a justice of the Wisconsin Supreme Court, serving since 2003, and previously served as the 26th chief justice of the court from 2015 through April 2021.  Her current term expires in 2023.

Early life and career
Roggensack was born in Joliet, Illinois. She graduated from Lockport Township High School in Lockport, Illinois; she then received her bachelor's degree from Drake University in 1962, and her J.D. degree from the University of Wisconsin Law School in 1980. Roggensack then practiced law in Madison, Wisconsin, for 16 years, including at DeWitt Ross & Stevens S.C.

Judicial career
Roggensack was elected to the Wisconsin Court of Appeals in 1996, narrowly defeating Milwaukee attorney Erica Eisinger in the spring general election. She served seven years on the Court of Appeals District IV, which was composed of most of central and southwestern Wisconsin, being reelected in 2002 without opposition.

Roggensack was elected to the Wisconsin Supreme Court in 2003, defeating Barron County Circuit Court Judge Edward R. Brunner.

Roggensack was elected Chief Justice of the Wisconsin Supreme Court by her peers on April 29, 2015, following the certification of votes from the April 2015 election. Voters approved an amendment to the state constitution that changed the way the chief justice of the Supreme Court was selected. Previously, the justice with the most seniority held the position, but the amendment allowed court members to choose the chief justice.

Following the justices' election of Roggensack as chief justice, former Chief Justice Shirley Abrahamson filed a federal lawsuit challenging the implementation of the constitutional amendment, which was heard on May 15, 2015. Five of the seven justices asked the federal judge to dismiss Abrahamson's lawsuit. On May 15, 2015 the federal court denied Abrahamson's request for immediate reinstatement as chief justice. U.S. District Judge James D. Peterson determined there was no harm in Roggensack serving as chief justice while Abrahamson's lawsuit continued.

Justice Roggensack ultimately relinquished the job of chief justice in April 2021, backing the election of Justice Annette Ziegler as the 27th Chief Justice of the Wisconsin Supreme Court.

In June 2021, the Wisconsin Supreme Court rejected a ban on absentee-ballot drop boxes. Roggensack dissented from the majority, voting to uphold the ban on absentee-ballot drop boxes, arguing there was a need for "judicial resolution by the Wisconsin Supreme Court before the 2022 elections begin."

Roggensack will retire at the end of her present term, which expires in July 2023.

COVID-19 stay-at-home controversy 

On May 5, 2020, during oral arguments in Wisconsin's stay-at-home order case, which challenges the extension of statewide business and school closures due to the outbreak of COVID-19, Roggensack challenged the idea that the outbreak was community-wide and could be replicated elsewhere. Arguing that the most recent increase in COVID cases mainly reflected an isolated outbreak at one meatpacking facility, she commented, "Due to the meatpacking, though, that's where Brown County got the flare. It wasn't just the regular folks in Brown County.”

A challenge to acting Wisconsin health secretary Andrea Palm's extension of statewide business and school closures, filed by Senate Majority Leader Scott L. Fitzgerald and House Speaker Robin Vos, Roggensack's comments sparked political criticism from Democratic lawmakers and labor union leaders, labeling her use of the term “regular folks” elitist, classist, and racist.

Precluded from commenting outside of court on cases pending judgement, Roggensack was unable to respond. Defending her statement, Rick Esenberg, President of the Wisconsin Institute for Law and Liberty, said that by "regular folks" Roggensack meant the general population of Brown County.

On May 13, 2020, the Supreme Court declared the stay-at-home order "unlawful, invalid, and unenforceable." In her majority opinion, Roggensack stated DHS Secretary Andrea Palm had no authority to enact the order.

Personal life and family

Roggensack's daughter, Ellen Brostrom, serves as a circuit court judge in Milwaukee County.

Electoral history

Wisconsin Supreme Court (1995)

| colspan="6" style="text-align:center;background-color: #e9e9e9;"| Primary Election, February 21, 1995

| colspan="6" style="text-align:center;background-color: #e9e9e9;"| General Election, April 4, 1995

Wisconsin Appeals Court (1996, 2002)

Wisconsin Supreme Court (2003, 2013)

| colspan="6" style="text-align:center;background-color: #e9e9e9;"| Primary Election, February 19, 2003

| colspan="6" style="text-align:center;background-color: #e9e9e9;"| General Election, April 1, 2003

| colspan="6" style="text-align:center;background-color: #e9e9e9;"| Primary Election, February 19, 2013

| colspan="6" style="text-align:center;background-color: #e9e9e9;"| General Election, April 2, 2013

Sources
'Safer at Home' questions, challenges persist as Wisconsin awaits court ruling
Chief justice: COVID-19 spread at meatpacking plant not affecting 'regular folks'

References

External links
 
 
 Patience Roggensack contributor profile at the Federalist Society
 Follow the Money - Patience Drake Roggensack
 2013 2003 1995 campaign contributions

|-

1940 births
20th-century American judges
20th-century American women judges
21st-century American women judges
21st-century American judges
Chief Justices of the Wisconsin Supreme Court
Drake University alumni
Justices of the Wisconsin Supreme Court
Lawyers from Madison, Wisconsin
Living people
People from Joliet, Illinois
People from Lockport, Illinois
Politicians from Madison, Wisconsin
University of Wisconsin Law School alumni
Wisconsin Court of Appeals judges
Women chief justices of state supreme courts in the United States